Schizothorax is a genus of cyprinid fish found in southern and western China, through northern South Asia (Himalaya) and Central Asia, to Iran, with a single species, S. prophylax, in Turkey. They are primarily found in highland rivers, streams and lakes, although a few species occur in lower-lying locations, like Lake Balkhash and lakes of the Sistan Basin. Their scientific name means "cloven-breast", from Ancient Greek  'to cleave' and  'breast-plate' (see also thorax). The western species are typically referred to as marinkas from their Russian name , while the eastern species are usually called snowtrout. Although they do resemble trouts in habitus this is merely due to convergent evolution and they are by no means closely related apart from both being Teleostei: Cyprinids are in the teleost superorder Ostariophysi, while trouts are in the superorder Protacanthopterygii. Their ancestors must thus have diverged as early as the Triassic, more than 200 million years ago.

Schizothorax is a part of the schizothoracines (snowtrout and allies), which also includes the genera Aspiorhynchus, Chuanchia, Diptychus, Gymnodiptychus, Gymnocypris, Oxygymnocypris, Platypharodon, Ptychobarbus, Schizopyge and Schizopygopsis. The last two were formerly often included in the present genus, and their delimitation is still not entirely clear. In any case, the genus Schizothorax (and other "snowtrouts") are in turn related to such cyprinids as the typical barbels (Barbus sensu stricto and the doubtfully distinct Luciobarbus and Messinobarbus), Carasobarbus, Labeobarbus, Aulopyge and Cyprinion. They were thus placed in the subfamily Barbinae, which is quite paraphyletic however and thus here merged with the Cyprininae at least for the largest part (including the marinkas), becoming its junior synonym in the process.

Species 

There are currently 65 recognized species in this genus:

 Schizothorax argentatus Kessler, 1874 (Balkhash marinka)
 Schizothorax beipanensis J. Yang, X. Y. Chen & J. X. Yang, 2009
 Schizothorax biddulphi Günther, 1876
 Schizothorax chivae Arunkumar & Alphonsa Moyon, 2016
 Schizothorax chongi (P. W. Fang, 1936)
 Schizothorax cryptolepis T. Y. Fu & M. R. Ye, 1984
 Schizothorax curvifrons Heckel, 1838 (Sattar snowtrout)
 Schizothorax curvilabiatus (Wu & Tsao, 1992)
 Schizothorax davidi (Sauvage, 1880)
 Schizothorax dolichonema Herzenstein, 1889
 Schizothorax dulongensis S. Y. Huang, 1985
 Schizothorax edeniana McClelland, 1842
 Schizothorax elongatus S. Y. Huang, 1985
 Schizothorax esocinus Heckel, 1838 (Chirruh snowtrout)
 Schizothorax eurystomus Kessler, 1872
 Schizothorax gongshanensis W. H. Tsao, 1964
 Schizothorax grahami (Regan, 1904)
 Schizothorax griseus Pellegrin, 1931
 Schizothorax heteri J. Yang, L. P. Zheng, X. Y. Chen & J. X. Yang, 2013 
 Schizothorax heterochilus M. R. Ye & T. Y. Fu, 1986
 Schizothorax heterophysallidos J. Yang, X. Y. Chen & J. X. Yang, 2009
 Schizothorax huegelii Heckel, 1838
 Schizothorax integrilabiatus (Wu et al., 1992)
 Schizothorax kozlovi A. M. Nikolskii, 1903
 Schizothorax kumaonensis Menon, 1971 (Kumaon snowtrout)
 Schizothorax labiatus (McClelland, 1842) (Kunar snowtrout)
 Schizothorax labrosus Y. H. Wang, D. D. Zhuang & L. C. Gao, 1981
 Schizothorax lantsangensis W. H. Tsao, 1964
 Schizothorax lepidothorax J. X. Yang, 1991
 Schizothorax leukus J. Yang, L. P. Zheng, X. Y. Chen & J. X. Yang, 2013
 Schizothorax lissolabiatus W. H. Tsao, 1964
 Schizothorax longibarbus (P. W. Fang, 1936)
 Schizothorax macrophthalmus Terashima, 1984 (Nepalese snowtrout)
 Schizothorax macropogon Regan, 1905
 Schizothorax malacanthus S. Y. Huang, 1985
 Schizothorax meridionalis W. H. Tsao, 1964
 Schizothorax microcephalus F. Day, 1877
 Schizothorax microstomus S. Y. Huang, 1982
 Schizothorax molesworthi (B. L. Chaudhuri, 1913) (Blunt-nosed snowtrout)
 Schizothorax myzostomus W. H. Tsao, 1964
 Schizothorax nasus Heckel, 1838 (Dongu snowtrout)
 Schizothorax nepalensis Terashima, 1984
 Schizothorax ninglangensis Y. H. Wang, K. X. Zhang & D. D. Zhuang, 1981
 Schizothorax nudiventris J. Yang, X. Y. Chen & J. X. Yang, 2009
 Schizothorax nukiangensis W. H. Tsao, 1964
 Schizothorax oconnori Lloyd, 1908
 Schizothorax oligolepis S. Y. Huang, 1985
 Schizothorax parvus W. H. Tsao, 1964 
 Schizothorax pelzami Kessler, 1870 (Transcaspian marinka)
 Schizothorax plagiostomus Heckel, 1838 
 Schizothorax prenanti (T. L. Tchang, 1930)
 Schizothorax progastus (McClelland, 1839) (Dinnawah snowtrout)
 Schizothorax prophylax Pietschmann, 1933 (Eğirdir marinka)
 Schizothorax pseudoaksaiensis Herzenstein, 1889 (Ili marinka)
 Schizothorax ramzani (Javed, Ullah & Pervaiz, 2012) 
 Schizothorax raraensis Terashima, 1984 (Rara snowtrout) 
 Schizothorax richardsonii (J. E. Gray, 1832) (Common snowtrout)
 Schizothorax rotundimaxillaris Y. F. Wu & C. Z. Wu, 1992
 †Schizothorax saltans Regan, 1905
 Schizothorax sinensis Herzenstein, 1889
 Schizothorax skarduensis Mirza & A. A. Awan, 1978
 Schizothorax waltoni Regan, 1905
 Schizothorax wangchiachii (P. W. Fang, 1936)
 Schizothorax yunnanensis Norman, 1923
 Schizothorax zarudnyi (A. M. Nikolskii, 1897)

References 

 
Cyprinidae genera
Cyprinid fish of Asia